Tutnall is a village in the Bromsgrove district of Worcestershire. It is in the civil parish of Tutnall and Cobley which has a population of 1,543. The A448 used to run through the centre of the village, though this is now bypassed by a modern dual carriageway.

References

Villages in Worcestershire